Riverview is a town in Oconto County, Wisconsin, United States. The population was 829 at the 2000 census.

Geography
According to the United States Census Bureau, the town has a total area of 71.7 square miles (185.8 km2), of which, 69.7 square miles (180.6 km2) of it is land and 2.0 square miles (5.2 km2) of it (2.80%) is water.

2007 Tornado
On June 7, 2007, an EF3 tornado struck the town of Riverview. The town municipal building and fire department were destroyed, along with nine homes.

Demographics
As of the census of 2000, there were 829 people, 415 households, and 275 families residing in the town. The population density was 11.9 people per square mile (4.6/km2). There were 1,552 housing units at an average density of 22.3 per square mile (8.6/km2). The racial makeup of the town was 98.31% White, 0.36% Native American, 0.12% from other races, and 1.21% from two or more races. Hispanic or Latino of any race were 0.36% of the population.

There were 415 households, out of which 12.8% had children under the age of 18 living with them, 59.5% were married couples living together, 4.1% had a female householder with no husband present, and 33.5% were non-families. 29.6% of all households were made up of individuals, and 13.3% had someone living alone who was 65 years of age or older. The average household size was 2.00 and the average family size was 2.37.

In the town, the population was spread out, with 11.6% under the age of 18, 3.1% from 18 to 24, 18.5% from 25 to 44, 37.4% from 45 to 64, and 29.4% who were 65 years of age or older. The median age was 55 years. For every 100 females, there were 111.5 males.  For every 100 females age 18 and over, there were 106.5 males.

The median income for a household in the town was $32,550, and the median income for a family was $37,279. Males had a median income of $30,556 versus $20,357 for females. The per capita income for the town was $19,272. About 4.4% of families and 6.4% of the population were below the poverty line, including 12.1% of those under age 18 and 5.3% of those age 65 or over.

References

External links
Town of Riverview, Oconto County, Wisconsin

Green Bay metropolitan area
Towns in Oconto County, Wisconsin
Towns in Wisconsin